"Colorado" is a song by Czech singer Mikolas Josef. It was released as a Digital download on 29 November 2019 by Vivienne Records. The song was written by Mikolas Josef, who also produced the song with Corey Le Rue.

Critical reception
Antranig Shokayan from Wiwibloggs gave the song a positive review stating, "Musically, the evolution is apparent — his post-Eurovision singles have all had unique sounds. Nonetheless, Mikolas does what he does best, nailing slick choreography and oozing major sex appeal. Eurovision’s Next Top Male Model knows what he wants and he will cross any Colorado desert to get it."

Music video
A music video to accompany the release of "Colorado" was first released onto YouTube on 28 November 2019. The music video was directed by Marco Grillotti and Mikolas Josef.

Charts

Weekly charts

Year-end charts

Release history

References

2019 singles
2019 songs
Mikolas Josef songs